Mastery Schools is a network of 24 charter schools with over 14,000 students in Philadelphia, Pennsylvania and Camden, New Jersey. It is headquartered at the Mastery Charter Pickett Campus in Germantown, Philadelphia.

Overview
Mastery began in 2001 with the Brook J. Lenfest Campus.

Schools
Elementary Schools
 Grover Cleveland Elementary (K–8)
 Clymer Elementary (K–6)
 Cramer Hill Elementary (K–8)
 Frederick Douglass Elementary (K–8)
Hardy Williams Elementary (K-6)
 Harrity Elementary (K–8)
 Mann Elementary (K–6)
 McGraw Elementary (K–5)
 Molina Elementary (K–8)
 Pastorius-Richardson Elementary (K–8)
 Smedley Elementary (K–6)
 Thomas Elementary (K–6)
 Hardy Williams Elementary (K–6)
 John Wister Elementary (K–5)
Middle Schools
 East Camden Middle School (6–8)
 Mastery Charter Prep Middle School (7–8)
High Schools
 Mastery High School of Camden (9–12)
 Simon Gratz (9–12)
 Lenfest Campus (7–12)
 Pickett Campus (6–12)
 Shoemaker Campus (7–12)
 Thomas Campus (7–12)
 Hardy Williams High (7–12)

References

External links
 

Charter schools in Pennsylvania
School District of Philadelphia